Cetore is a small village in the Municipality of Izola in the Littoral region of Slovenia.

Name
The name of the settlement was changed from Cetore to Vinica in 1957. The name Vinica was an ideological (i.e., anti-Italian) change under the communist regime, referring to the native village of the Slovene poet Oton Župančič, who was born in Vinica, White Carniola. The name Cetore was restored in 1988.

References

External links 
Cetore on Geopedia

Populated places in the Municipality of Izola